Spirit of the Wind is a fantasy novel by Chris Pierson, set in the world of Dragonlance, which is based on the Dungeons & Dragons fantasy role-playing game.

Plot summary
This novel is set after the Chaos War. In the east, on the Dairly Plans, the peace is shattered by the threat of the red dragon Malystryx. The kender Kronn-alin Thistleknot travels to Abasasinia with his older sister Catt, where they seek heroes to stop the dragon from destroying Kendermore. Riverwind and his daughter Brightdawn set out on a quest to save the kender from the dragon's wrath.

1998 American novels
American fantasy novels
Dragonlance novels